The telenka (telynka, tylynka) is an overtone flute, a primitive form of dentsivka without fingerholes. 

The pitch produced from the instrument is changed by placing a finger into the open end of the pipe, and covering this opening by a half or third etc. and also by the strength of the player's breath. 

It is made from linden, elder, sycamore or willow.  Its length is approximately 35 to 40 cm (14 to 16 in), although instruments can range up to 60 cm (24 in) in length. 

This instrument is very common in Romania especially in the areas bordering with the Ukrainian Bukovina area where it is known as the tilinca. A Romanian tilinca without top is often confused with the Hungarian tilinko with top, which is easier to play for beginners (in a way, a Romanian kaval without fingerholes).

The telenka, along with the sopilka, is a prominent instrument in Kalush Orchestra's 2022 song "Stefania", which won the Eurovision Song Contest for Ukraine.

See also
Kalyuka
Koncovka
Ukrainian folk music

Sources

Humeniuk, A. - Ukrainski narodni muzychni instrumenty - Kyiv: "Naukova dumka", 1967
Mizynec, V. - Ukrainian Folk Instruments - Melbourne: Bayda books, 1984
Cherkaskyi, L. - Ukrainski narodni muzychni instrumenty // Kyiv: "Tekhnika",  2003 - 262 pages.

References

External links
Samples and Pictures of Ukrainian Instruments
 jouer de la tilinca moldave

Romanian musical instruments
Russian musical instruments
Ukrainian musical instruments
End-blown flutes
Fipple flutes